A four-funnel liner, also known as a four-stacker, is an ocean liner with four funnels.

, launched in 1897, was the first ocean liner to have four funnels and was one of the first of the golden era of ocean liners that became prominent in the 20th century.

In all, 15 four-funnel liners were produced; Great Eastern in 1858, and the remainder between 1897 and 1922. Four were sunk during the World Wars, and all others besides Titanic were scrapped.

 was the fastest of all four-funnelled liners.

Description

Rise of the four-funnel liner 
The primary purpose of funnels on steamships was to allow smoke, heat and excess steam to escape from the boiler rooms. As liners became larger, more boilers were used. The number of funnels became symbolic of speed and safety, so shipping companies sometimes added false funnels—like the —to give an impression of power.

The SS Great Eastern, launched on 31 January 1858 (a full 40 years ahead of any comparable ships), was the only ocean liner to sport five funnels. As one funnel was later removed in 1865, the Great Eastern, by default, became the first ocean liner to have four funnels. However, the Great Eastern was converted to a Cable laying vessel not long afterwards and never operated as a liner when she only had 4 funnels.

The SS Kaiser Wilhelm der Grosse, launched on 4 May 1897, was the first purpose-built ocean liner to have four funnels and was one of the first of the golden era of ocean liners that became prominent in the early- to mid-20th century.

In keeping with the style and fashion of the early-20th century, the White Star Line opted to fit the three Olympic-class ships with a dummy fourth funnel to rival the two Cunard ships.

End of the four-funnel liner 
The ideology of four funnels representing size and power rapidly diminished soon after the First World War.  Subsequent flagships including the SS Imperator, SS Normandie, and RMS Queen Mary all sported three funnels to conserve deck space.  Later, as shipbuilding became more efficient, the RMS Queen Elizabeth, RMS Mauretania, SS Bremen, SS Nieuw Amsterdam, and SS America further reduced the number of funnels down to two.  Today's modern cruise ships are mostly built with only a single funnel, and many military vessels no longer sport them at all.

Soon, the remaining four-funnel liners seemed old. The first four-funnel liner to go was the Titanic when she sank in 1912 after hitting an iceberg. During the First World War, the Kaiser Wilhelm der Grosse, Lusitania, and Britannic sank after being attacked by enemy vessels (with Britannic striking a mine). The last four-funnel liners built were the sister ships Arundel Castle and Windsor Castle which entered service in 1921. By 1922, only 10 of the 14 four-funnel liners remained. In 1923, the ex-SS Kronprinz Wilhelm was sold for scrap, followed by the ex-Deutschland in 1925.

By the start of the Great Depression, only 8 four-funnel liners remained. In 1935, the Mauretania, Olympic and France were sold for scrap after 28, 24, and 23 years of service respectively. In 1937, the Arundel Castle and Windsor Castle were refurbished by having two of their four funnels removed and their bows replaced by more raked bows, leaving the Kaiser Wilhelm II, Kronprinzessin Cecilie and Aquitania as the three remaining four-funnel liners.  In 1940, the ex-Kaiser Wilhelm II and ex-Kronprinzessin Cecilie were sold for scrap.  The Aquitania, now the last four-funnel liner afloat, served in the Second World War and thereafter enjoyed a quiet postwar career, until finally she was scrapped in 1950.  With this, the era of the four-funnel liner came to an end.

List of four funnel liners

Notes:

Proposed ships 
The United States never operated any four-funnelled ocean liners in commercial service. However, in the late 1910s, William Francis Gibbs began to draft designs for new 1,000-foot liners that could reach a speed of 30 knots. Among the proposals was a pair of four-funnelled ships designed in 1919. The funnel and boiler arrangement would have been similar to the German four stackers, with the four funnels grouped in pairs with a wider gap between the second and third funnels. Possible names for the liners were the SS Boston and the SS Independence. The ships never made it past the design phase.

The exact intended design of Oceanic III is unknown, although company concept renderings show it to be a three-funnelled  liner. However, early plans from Harland and Wolff's archives show a design from 1927 for a four-funnelled liner almost identical to the Olympic-class, except with a more-modern cruiser stern. Construction of Oceanic III halted in mid-1929, before the onset of the Great Depression led to its cancellation.

References

External links